ACS Synthetic Biology is a peer-reviewed scientific journal published by the American Chemical Society. It began publishing accepted articles in the Fall of 2011, with the first full monthly issue published in January 2012. It covers all aspects of synthetic biology, including molecular, systems, and synthetic research. The founding editor-in-chief is Christopher Voigt (Massachusetts Institute of Technology).

Types of articles 
The journal publishes
 Letters: Short reports of original research focused on an individual finding
 Articles: Original research presenting findings of immediate, broad interest.
 Reviews: Expert perspectives and analyses of recently published research
 Technical Notes: Concise communications that focus on the characterization of new or interesting tools and websites
 Tutorials: Detailed descriptions of synthetic, computational, and systems methodologies

References

External links

See also
Systems and Synthetic Biology 

Publications established in 2012
Monthly journals
Synthetic Biology
English-language journals
Biochemistry journals
Synthetic biology